Ker Chien-ming (born 8 September 1951) is a Taiwanese politician.

Early life
He obtained his bachelor's degree in dental science from Chung Shan Medical University and master's degree in management science from Tamkang University.

Political career
He is a member of the Democratic Progressive Party and has served in the Legislative Yuan since 1993, representing Hsinchu district from 1993 to 2008 and again starting in 2016. From 2008 to 2016, Ker was elected via proportional representation. For the 2020 legislative election, Ker returned to Democratic Progressive Party list.

References

|-

1951 births
Democratic Progressive Party Members of the Legislative Yuan
Living people
Tamkang University alumni
Members of the 8th Legislative Yuan
Members of the 9th Legislative Yuan
Party List Members of the Legislative Yuan
Hsinchu Members of the Legislative Yuan
Members of the 2nd Legislative Yuan
Members of the 3rd Legislative Yuan
Members of the 4th Legislative Yuan
Members of the 5th Legislative Yuan
Members of the 6th Legislative Yuan
Members of the 7th Legislative Yuan
Chung Shan Medical University alumni